Glipa quiquefasciata is a species of beetle in the genus Glipa. It was described in 1933.

References

quiquefasciata
Beetles described in 1933